George F. Baker High School is the public secondary school educating students in grades 6 through 12 in the Tuxedo Union Free School District. It is located on NY 17 in Tuxedo, New York, United States, near the gates of the village Tuxedo Park.

It educates students from the town of Tuxedo and the village, as well as those from the Greenwood Lake Union Free School District in the nearby Town of Warwick.

In 2015 the school enrollment dropped by over 200 to about 80 students, after Greenwood Lake School District ended its contract to send students to Tuxedo. This caused a drop of $2.5 million in the Tuxedo budget. The school planned to expand the Baker school to grades 7-12. Also in 2015, the school's principal and superintendent resigned their positions.

References

Public high schools in New York (state)
Schools in Orange County, New York